Varden “Vardiko” Nadibaidze (born March 31, 1939) is a retired Soviet and Russian military officer who served as Georgia’s Minister of Defense from 1994 to 1998.

Nadibaidze was born in the village Mleta in then-Soviet Georgia. In 1955 he joined the Komsomol and in 1958 became a member of the Communist Party of the Soviet Union. He received military education in Soviet Russia and joined the Soviet Army as a motorised rifle officer in 1960. He served in Soviet units in Ukraine, East Germany, and Transcaucasia. In 1989, he was promoted to major general. After the dissolution of the Soviet Union, Nadibaidze continued his service in the Russian Army and, in 1992, was made the deputy commander of the Transcaucasian Military District headquartered in Georgia’s capital Tbilisi. 

In the chaotic aftermath of the Georgian Civil War, in April 1994, Georgia’s head of state Eduard Shevardnadze appointed Nadibaidze Minister of Defense of Georgia after General Gia Karkarashvili was forced to resign. Nadibaidze dismissed nationalistically minded officers and introduced ethnic Georgians from the Russian army and with Soviet military experience. Shevardnadze’s appointment of the Russian general (he could barely speak Georgian) to a key military post was seen in Georgia as a move which allowed Russia to control the Georgian military. Under Nadibaidze, the size of the army was reduced and the conscription system made more orderly. Nadibaidze supported close cooperation with Russia and was a personal friend of the Russian defense minister Pavel Grachev. When Grachev was sacked in 1996, Aleksandr Lebed, Chairman of Russia's Security Council, alleged that Nadibaidze was among the Russian officers plotting a coup in support of Grachev. The allegations were dismissed by Nadibaidze. Nadibaidze was a target of criticism from the opposition, most prominently by Giorgi Chanturia, and some government officials, such as Vice-Premier Tamaz Nadareishvili, who accused him of mismanaging the military.   

After the 1998 attempt to assassinate Shevardnadze, with its revelations of army complicity, and with Shevardnadze looking to the West, Nadibaidze was replaced, in April 1998, by the United States-trained officer David Tevzadze.

References

    
    
    
    
    

1939 births
Generals from Georgia (country)
Generals of the Defense Forces of Georgia
Soviet Georgian generals
Russian lieutenant generals
Soviet major generals
Government ministers of Georgia (country)
Living people